Kenkoku University, or Jianguo in Chinese ( or "Nation-Building University"), was a short-lived university in Hsinking (modern Changchun, Jilin province), the capital of Manchukuo, the Japanese puppet state in occupied Manchuria during the Second Sino-Japanese War.

The university was founded in 1938 by General Kanji Ishiwara, and was run by Professor Shoichi Sakuda of Kyoto University. Its purpose was to promote "ethnic harmony" in the region, legitimising and promoting the Japanese occupation. To this end, students were recruited from Japan, China proper, Mongolia, Taiwan, Manchuria, Korea and Russia. As well as offering free tuition, the University also provided its students with board and lodgings, and a stipend.

The university closed in 1945 when the Kwantung Army were beaten by Soviet red army.

A number of influential aikido practitioners trained and taught at the University, including aikido's founder Morihei Ueshiba, Kenji Tomiki, Shigenobu Okumura and Noriaki Inoue.

Multiple students of Kenkoku University later became prominent political figures in South Korea—including later South Korean prime minister Kang Young-hoon—, North Korea and China.

References

Defunct universities and colleges in China
Universities in Manchukuo
Universities and colleges in Changchun
1938 establishments in China
1945 disestablishments in China
Educational institutions established in 1938
Educational institutions disestablished in 1945